The following table presents an incomplete list of monuments classified monument historique in the city of Metz, capital of the French region of Lorraine and prefecture of the department of Moselle.

List of the Historic Monuments in Metz

Religious Monuments

Military Monuments

Civil Monuments

Administrative Monuments

References 

 Philippe Hubert, Metz, ville d’architectures, Serge Domini éditeur, Ars-sur-Moselle, 2004 ; 216 p.
 Jean-Louis Jolin, Trésors de Metz, Serge Domini éditeur, Ars-sur-Moselle, 2008, 160 p., .
 Christiane Pignon-Feller, Metz, les métamorphoses d’une ville (1848-1918), Éditions Serpenoise, Metz, 2005, 628 p., .
 Niels Wilcken, Metz et Guillaume II. L’architecture publique à Metz au temps de l’empire allemand (1871-1918), Éditions Serpenoise, Metz, 2007, 136 p., .

Buildings and structures in Metz
Metz, France
History of Metz